Howie Schwab (born 1960) is an American sports trivia expert and television personality. He is best known as the final adversary on ESPN's Stump the Schwab show.

Biography 
Schwab is a native of Baldwin, New York.  A 1982 graduate of St. John's University, Schwab served as the editor-in-chief of College & Pro Football News Weekly in the mid-1980s before joining ESPN in 1987. By 1995, he was the coordinating producer for the network's website, ESPN.com. Beginning in 1998, Schwab served as a coordinating producer for ESPN studio production, which entailed duties on programs including SportsCenter and Outside the Lines. Schwab also served as the resident Couch Potato on ESPN's First Take, on which he discussed the top sports television programming each weekend, evaluating the TV lineups of Friday, Saturday, and Sunday on a 1–5 bags of chips rating system. Schwab also appeared with Merril Hoge and Matthew Berry on ESPNEWS' Sunday Fantasy Insider.

As part of cost-cutting efforts, Schwab was released from ESPN in June 2013. In 2014, Schwab joined Sports Jeopardy! as a consultant and writer.

References

1960 births
Living people
American television personalities
People from Baldwin, Nassau County, New York
St. John's University (New York City) alumni